Treadnauts is a 2D multiplayer action video game developed by Topstitch Games. Treadnauts was released on August 17, 2018 for macOS, Microsoft Windows, Nintendo Switch, PlayStation 4, and Xbox One.

Gameplay 
The players take control of a tank on the field with different maps while shooting another tank in a competitive playground and it contains 2-4 players. Various power-ups can be picked on the crate like laser guns, camouflage, jetpack, and others. players can fire boosters while hopping into mid-air. the game also has a singleplayer mode for a player to practice their shooting range.

Reception 
On Gamerankings, Treadnauts has received 75.00% and 7.5 on nintendoworldreport. Treadnauts has won Casual Connect Indie Prize: Best Multiplayer Game, Seattle Indie Game Competition Finalist., iFest People's Choice Award 2017 and also PAX West 2018.

References

External links
 

2018 video games
Multiplayer video games
Tank simulation video games
Video games developed in the United States
Windows games
Windows-only games